Mladen Bogdanović (3 October 1960 – 22 June 2003) was a Yugoslav footballer who played as a forward.

External links
 
 list of Split players
 article about transfer to Uskok

1960 births
2003 deaths
Yugoslav footballers
Association football forwards
HNK Hajduk Split players
NK Čelik Zenica players
HNK Cibalia players
FK Borac Banja Luka players
Footballers from Sarajevo